Edward Lawson may refer to:

 Edward Lawson (VC) (1873–1955), British army soldier and recipient of the Victoria Cross
 Edward B. Lawson (1895–1962), American diplomat
 Edward C. Lawson, American civil rights activist
 Edward M. Lawson (born 1929), Canadian politician
 Edward Lawson, 4th Baron Burnham (1890–1963), British newspaper executive and Territorial Army officer
 Eddie Lawson (born 1958), motorcyclist
 Eddie Lawson (Waterloo Road), fictional character

See also
Edward Larson (disambiguation)